Ballaroo is a semi-arid rural locality in the Maranoa Region, Queensland, Australia.

Geography 
The Cogoon River (Muckadilla Creek) flows, most often with little flow, through the locality from the north (Mount Abundance) to the south-east (Weribone) where it becomes a tributary of the Balonne River.

History 
The colonial surveyor-general Thomas Mitchell and party followed the Cogoon River from the Balonne to Mount Abundance, when passing through this area in 1846.

References 

Maranoa Region
Localities in Queensland